Alexander Georgievich Karpovtsev (April 7, 1970 – September 7, 2011) was a Russian ice hockey player and an assistant coach for Ak Bars Kazan and Lokomotiv Yaroslavl of the Kontinental Hockey League (KHL). In the National Hockey League (NHL), he played for the New York Rangers, Toronto Maple Leafs, Chicago Blackhawks, New York Islanders, and Florida Panthers. He, Alexei Kovalev, Sergei Zubov and Sergei Nemchinov were the first Russian players to have their names engraved on the Stanley Cup, winning it in 1994 with the Rangers. He was traded by the Maple Leafs to the Blackhawks for Bryan McCabe after a contract dispute where Kaprovstev was seeking a salary that would have made him the highest paid defender on the team.

Karpovtsev, while an assistant coach for Lokomotiv Yaroslavl, died in the 2011 Lokomotiv Yaroslavl plane crash.

Personal life
Alexander Karpovtsev was married to Janna Karpovtsev.

Death

On September 7, 2011, Karpovtsev was killed when a Yakovlev Yak-42 passenger aircraft, carrying nearly his entire Lokomotiv team, crashed just outside Yaroslavl, Russia. The team was traveling to Minsk to play their opening game of the season, with its coaching staff and prospects. Lokomotiv officials said "'everyone from the main roster was on the plane plus four players from the youth team.'"

Career statistics

Regular season and playoffs

International

Transactions
September 7. 1993– Traded by the Quebec Nordiques to the New York Rangers in exchange for Mike Hurlbut.
October 14, 1998– Traded by the New York Rangers, along with the Rangers' 1999 fourth-round draft choice, to the Toronto Maple Leafs in exchange for Mathieu Schneider.
October 2, 2000– Traded by the Toronto Maple Leafs, along with Toronto's 2001 fourth-round draft choice, to the Chicago Blackhawks in exchange for Bryan McCabe.
March 9, 2004– Traded by the Chicago Blackhawks to the New York Islanders in exchange for New York's 2005 fourth-round draft choice (Niklas Hjalmarsson).
July 14, 2004– Signed as a free agent with the Florida Panthers.

References

External links

1970 births
2011 deaths
Avangard Omsk players
Chicago Blackhawks players
Florida Panthers players
HC Dynamo Moscow players
HC Sibir Novosibirsk players
Lokomotiv Yaroslavl players
New York Islanders players
New York Rangers players
Quebec Nordiques draft picks
Russian ice hockey coaches
Russian ice hockey defencemen
Soviet ice hockey defencemen
Ice hockey people from Moscow
Stanley Cup champions
Toronto Maple Leafs players
Victims of the Lokomotiv Yaroslavl plane crash